Vegetable kolhapuri is a dish from the city of Kolhapur in Maharashtra, India consisting of mixed vegetables in a thick, spiced gravy. It is served as a main course accompanied by breads such as chapatis.

References

Maharashtrian cuisine
Kolhapur